Events from the year 1797 in Spain

Incumbents
 Monarch – Charles IV

Events
Battle of Cape St. Vincent (1797), one of the opening battles of the Anglo-Spanish War (1796-1808), resulting in a British victory under Sir John Jervis.
Battle of Santa Cruz de Tenerife (1797), an amphibious assault by the Royal Navy on the Spanish port city of Santa Cruz de Tenerife in the Canary Islands launched by Rear-Admiral Horatio Nelson. The result was a Spanish victory by truce after Nelson's party had lost several hundred men.
 1797 Riobamba earthquake, a deadly earthquake causing between 6,000-40,000 casualties in the Riomba and surrounding Interandean valley. The epicenter reached at least XI (Extreme) on the Mercalli intensity scale. This is the most powerful historical event in Ecuador.
 Mission San José (California), the fourteenth historic Spanish mission located in the present-day city of Fremont, California by the Franciscan order on June 11, 1797.
 Guantánamo was founded in 1797.

Births

Deaths

References

 
Years of the 18th century in Spain